Langkap (Jawi: لڠكڤ) is a small town in Hilir Perak District, Perak, Malaysia.

Hilir Perak District
Towns in Perak